The Boston Investigator was the first American newspaper dedicated to the philosophy of freethought. The newspaper was started in 1831 by Abner Kneeland, and published by John Q. Adams.

The newspaper was notable for its anti-religious view, reagarding Christian beliefs with harsh skepticism.

References

External links
 Bostonian Society. Photo of Boston Investigator building, Washington Street, Boston, ca.1874.

Freethought
Newspapers published in Boston
19th century in Boston